AVG may refer to:

 , a former German publishing house
 Average, a statistical measurement
 AVG Technologies, a Czech company that develops antivirus and internet security software
 AVG (software), a range of antivirus and internet security software from AVG Technologies
 Antivirus Gold, a rogue software that poses as a legitimate antivirus program
 Automatic voltage gain, automatic control of electronic amplification level
 American Volunteer Group, volunteer air force units organized by the United States government in 1941 and 1942
 Auxiliary aircraft ferry (United States Navy hull classification symbol), a type of escort carrier
 , a public transport operator in the area of Karlsruhe, Germany
  (potatoes, meat, vegetables), the standard fare in Dutch cuisine